Lois Burwell (born 1960) is a British Oscar-winning makeup artist.  She won the Best Makeup Oscar at the 68th Academy Awards for the film Braveheart, which she shared with Peter Frampton and Paul Pattison. She received her second Academy Award nomination at the 71st Academy Awards  for Saving Private Ryan (losing to Elizabeth), which she shared with Conor O'Sullivan and Daniel C. Striepeke. She frequently collaborates with Steven Spielberg, having worked on five of his films.

Personal life

Lois Burwell has been married since 14 November 1998 to cinematographer John Toll, who has won two Academy Awards for Best Cinematography for the critically and commercially successful films Braveheart and Legends of the Fall.

She holds dual citizenships in the United States and the United Kingdom.

Positions 
In 2015, Burwell was elected the Governor for the Makeup Artists and Hair Stylists branch of the Academy of Motion Picture Arts and Sciences, and in 2017, she was elected the first Vice President of the Academy.

For the 7th season of Face Off  Burwell replaced judge Ve Neill who was not able to be present for the competition.

Selected filmography
The BFG (2016)
Lincoln (2012)
War Horse (2011)
War of the Worlds (2005)
The Last Samurai (2003)
Catch Me if You Can (2002)
The Green Mile (1999)
Saving Private Ryan (1998)
The Fifth Element (1997)
Mission: Impossible (1996)
Braveheart (1995)
The Muppet Christmas Carol (1992)
Who Framed Roger Rabbit (1988)
The Princess Bride (1987)

References

External links

Best Makeup Academy Award winners
Living people
1960 births
English artists
British make-up artists